Harold William Heller (September 3, 1935 – September 11, 2020) was an American politician and educator.

Heller served as the Dean, College of Education and Director of the Wally and Louise Bishop Center for Ethical Leadership and Civic Engagement at the University of South Florida St. Petersburg. Immediately prior to assuming these positions he served two terms in the Florida House of Representatives, representing Florida House District 52. Heller had a long history of community service having served on or chairing a number of non-profit  agencies and organizations boards of directors. Heller chaired the Pinellas County Cultural Foundation and served on the boards of Family Resources, Suncoast Hospice Institute, St Petersburg Preservation, The Mahaffey Theater Foundation and the advisory boards of the Dunedin Fine Arts Center and Studio 620. Heller and his wife were married for 59 years and had three children and three grandchildren.

Early life
Heller was born in Scales Mound, Illinois. He attended Bradley University in 1954. From 1954 to 1956 he served in the United States Army, with the 82nd Airborne Division. He earned the Parachutist Badge and the Expert Rifleman's Badge. He graduated from  Southern Illinois University with a Bachelor of Science degree in elementary and special education in 1959 and received a
Master of Science degree from Northern Illinois University in guidance and counseling in 1961. He earned an Education Doctorate from the University of Northern Colorado in special education in 1964.

Academic career
From 1980 to 1992, he was dean of the University of North Carolina at Charlotte's College of Education and Allied Professions. He moved to Florida in 1992 to head University of South Florida St. Petersburg campus. He was the first permanent head of the St. Petersburg campus in three years, beginning in August 1992. His predecessor, Lowell E. Davis, had died in 1989. A number of temporary replacements had served in the interim. His brief was to develop the campus' business, liberal arts, and journalism departments, as well as to complete the library and marine center building  projects.

Heller led the St. Petersburg campus as dean and chief executive officer from 1992 to 2002. He resigned as CEO of the St. Petersburg campus at the behest of USF president Judy Genshaft and became a faculty member in August 2002.
The City Council had planned demolishing its Bayfront Center arena and theater complex to USF and renting the land to USF, which would have used the land to build a conference center. They had second thoughts when Heller resigned. A rental agreement with an outside agency such as USF would have required a referendum. Other options included renovation and  finding some other use for the land after demolition. His successor was Karen White, former dean of fine arts at the University of Nebraska at Omaha and a concert violinist, originally from Joplin, Missouri.

Campaign and election in 2006
Though party officials usually remain neutral in primaries, Heller was endorsed over Liz McCallum by several Pinellas Democrats in the contest to decide who would run to succeed Frank Farkas. These included County Commissioner Calvin Harris, State Representatives Charlie Justice and Frank Peterman, Jr. as well as St. Petersburg City Council members James Bennett, Rick Kriseman, and Rene Flowers, and School Board member Linda Lerner. County Commissioner Ken Welch remained neutral as he sat on the county canvassing board. McCallum had narrowly lost to Farkas in the 2004 election, by less than 3,000 votes. Despite McCallum's strong showing in 2004, Heller was encouraged to run by colleague Betty Castor, a former president of USF and former Florida Secretary of Education. He came into the race at a time when McCallum had been running about a year. He had remained active in the community after stepping down as head of the St. Petersburg campus, with membership on the boards of directors of Bayfront Medical Center, the Community Foundation of Tampa Bay, Great Explorations museum, Florida International Museum and Pinellas Association of Retarded Children. He cited his education experience and ties to the community as important qualities.

His community connections allowed Heller to quickly overcome his late start in fundraising, and swamp McCallum's campaign efforts. While she was taking a traditional door-to-door approach, he was able to raise money by making phone calls to acquaintances he had made over the previous 14 years. The St. Petersburg Times endorsed Heller, citing his ability to solve problems through consensus building and  his work to make USF St. Petersburg independent. It also praised his success at promoting a successful referendum to improve taxpayer funding of teacher's pay, and his leadership in saving Sunken Gardens. A PAC, Pinellas Democrats PAC, endorsed a slate of candidates and ran an ad attacking Heller. In return, a graphic designer who had done work for the Heller campaign accused the PAC of violating contribution laws based on a $5000 contribution it had received, and lashed out against the wrongness of Democrats attacking fellow democrats. The PAC representatives countered that the $500 limit per individual contributor does not apply to PAC's. The Florida Democratic Party protested the use of the word "Democrats" in its name. Heller narrowly defeated McCallum in the primary, to face Republican Angelo Cappelli, the chair of the St. Anthony Hospital Foundation in November.

Similar in some ways, Heller and Cappelli differed in personality and their views on social issues. Cappelli  was seen as taking an authoritarian approach, while Heller was more inclined to collaborate with others. Heller favored  prosecuting crimes based on sexual orientation as hate crimes and supported same sex-unions. He said he would ban selling semi-automatic weapons, and advocated including contraceptive and safe sex information in sex education classes. Heller supported embryonic stem cell research and categorized himself as pro-choice. A local political analyst, Darryl Paulson, described their differences on social issues as irrelevant, with property insurance as the most important issue for voters. Heller said he would address cherry picking by auto and life insurance companies. Cappelli favored encouraging insurance companies to return to the Florida market by implementing a state catastrophe fund. Capelli was seen as appealing to the Republican base and received large contributions from individuals and from the Florida Republican Party, Heller's support was seen as going beyond the Democratic Party because of his long term civic activity and because he was seen as someone able to work across party lines. Heller again faced an attack campaign when Capielli approved a flier paid for by the Florida Republican party that described Heller as a "nutty professor." The ad misrepresented Heller's support of the teacher's pay referendum, which was overwhelmingly supported by the voters, as a pro tax increase stance. Heller again received the St. Petersburg Times endorsement. Once again, Heller's years with USF and his involvement with the community, and his ability to work with others were cited as essential qualities. Added to this was the position that his progressivism more closely reflected the interests and views of voters in District 52. Despite the attack campaign and a disadvantage in campaign contributions, Heller's popularity won him the election handily. His long term ties to the area included a friendship with Republican Governor Charlie Crist, who endorsed neither candidate.

First term in the Florida Legislature
In his freshman term, he was a member of the Agribusiness, Utilities and Telecommunications, and Post Secondary Education Committees as well as a member of  the Schools and Learning Council. He was ranking Democrat on the Post Secondary Education Committee. He sponsored a number of bills.

In June 2006, a Pinellas Park man had claimed to have been thrown out of a bar for not drinking, despite his assertions that he was acting as the designated driver for his group. Sen. Mike Fasano, who claims to be a non drinker, took umbrage with this and introduced in the Senate a bill to illegalize requiring bar patrons to drink. Heller sponsored the bill in the House. There was an increase in the number of homeless people attacked by bored teenagers in Florida in 2006. In response, the Legislature acted to stiffen prison sentences for those who attack the homeless. Heller was one of four House sponsors of the bill. State Senator Arthenia Joyner sponsored an identical bill in the Senate.

Heller and two other Pinellas Democrats, Janet C. Long and Darryl Rouson voted to support the use of school vouchers, which Florida Democrats have historically been opposed to, citing separation issues. Heller had originally been opposed, but says he was persuaded that it was an issue of quality education after meeting with the parents who were using vouchers to send their children to a private school.
He opposed a Bill in 2008 (HB 257) that would require pregnant women have a sonogram before undergoing a first-trimester abortion.

Campaign and election in 2008
Heller was among three Pinellas legislative candidates endorsed by the Suncoast Group for the Sierra Club, with Carl Zimmerman and Janet C. Long.  He was endorsed by the St. Petersburg Chamber of Commerce,  and Associated Industries of Florida. He also won the endorsement of the St. Petersburg Times. They cited his ability to work across party lines and experience as an educator and former administrator with USF. They credited him with legislation that reduced the influence of the FCAT, working to ensure that autistic children would be able to receive health care coverage, and with the designated driver law.  They believed he would be able to help prioritize educational programs in an era of reduced expenditures and increasing budgetary constraints. They also said he would offer insight into the problem of making windstorm insurance coverage more available and more affordable.

Representative Heller won re-election on November 4, 2008, defeating Republican Ross Johnson with 60% of the vote. Their campaign was good-natured with them waving to voters side by side on the same St. Petersburg street corner. He had support from Republican mayors Rick Baker of St. Petersburg and Frank Hibbard of Clearwater.

Death
Heller died on September 11, 2020.

Sources
 "State House Districts 52, 54, 55, 56 elections." Baynews9. November 5, 2008. Online. November 5, 2008.

References

External links
 Florida House of Representatives Profile
 Project Vote Smart – profile for Dr. Bill Heller

Democratic Party members of the Florida House of Representatives
1935 births
2020 deaths
People from Jo Daviess County, Illinois
Military personnel from Illinois
Bradley University alumni
Southern Illinois University alumni
Northern Illinois University alumni
University of Northern Colorado alumni
People from St. Petersburg, Florida
University of North Carolina at Charlotte people
University of South Florida people
21st-century American politicians